The Nevada State has been the name of two schools in Nevada. First there was Nevada State University from 1881–1905, which is currently known as the University of Nevada, Reno. The other is Nevada State College, which has been known as such since its formation in 2002.

Nevada State University
Nevada State College